César Augusto Ramírez Caje (born 24 March 1977), nicknamed El Tigre (Tiger), is a Paraguayan retired footballer who played as a forward.

He spent most of his professional career with Cerro Porteño (two spells, nine seasons in total), but also competed in Argentina and Portugal.

A Paraguayan international for nine years, Ramírez represented the nation at the 1998 World Cup.

Club career
Born in Curuguaty, Ramírez made his Paraguayan Primera División on 24 June 1995 at the age of 18, featuring for Club Cerro Corá in a 0–0 draw against Club Olimpia. In January 1997 he moved abroad for the first time, going on to spend two 1/2-seasons with Sporting Clube de Portugal, for whom he rarely played.

In 1999, following a spell in Argentina with Club Atlético Vélez Sársfield, Ramírez signed with Cerro Porteño back in his homeland, scoring seven goals in 22 games in the 2001 national championship to help his team lift the trophy. He bettered that to a career-high 13 goals three years later, with the tournament also ending in conquest.

Ramírez joined Brazil's Clube de Regatas do Flamengo in 2005, netting 11 times in 32 matches all competitions comprised during his one-year spell and ranking tenth-alltime foreign top scorer at the time of his retirement. Subsequently, he returned to Cerro for a further four top level campaigns, calling it quits at 33.

International career
Ramírez made his debut for the Paraguay national team in 1997. He was selected by manager Paulo César Carpegiani for his 1998 FIFA World Cup squad, and appeared in two group stage contests in France, against Bulgaria and Spain (both 0–0 draws).

Additionally, Ramírez played six World Cup qualifiers during his international tenure.

Honours

Club
Flamengo
Brazilian Cup: 2006

Cerro Porteño
Paraguayan League: 2001, 2004, Apertura 2009

References

External links

1977 births
Living people
Paraguayan footballers
Association football forwards
Paraguayan Primera División players
Cerro Porteño players
Primeira Liga players
Sporting CP footballers
Argentine Primera División players
Club Atlético Vélez Sarsfield footballers
Campeonato Brasileiro Série A players
CR Flamengo footballers
Paraguay under-20 international footballers
Paraguay international footballers
1998 FIFA World Cup players
Paraguayan expatriate footballers
Expatriate footballers in Portugal
Expatriate footballers in Argentina
Expatriate footballers in Brazil
Paraguayan expatriate sportspeople in Portugal